The 2017–18 Sacramento State Hornets men's basketball team represented California State University, Sacramento during the 2017–18 NCAA Division I men's basketball season. The Hornets, led by 10th-year head coach Brian Katz, played their home games at the Hornets Nest in Sacramento, California, as members of the Big Sky Conference. They finished the season 7–25, 4–14 in Big Sky play to finish in 11th place. They lost in the first of the Big Sky tournament to Portland State

Previous season
The Hornets finished the 2016–17 season 13–18, 9–9 in Big Sky play to finish in seventh place. As the No. 7 seed in the Big Sky tournament, they defeated Idaho State in the first round, before losing to Eastern Washington in the quarterfinals.

Offseason

Departures

2017 recruiting class

Roster

Schedule and results

|-
!colspan=9 style=| Exhibition

|-
!colspan=9 style=| Non-conference regular season

|-
!colspan=9 style=| Big Sky regular season

|-
!colspan=9 style=| Big Sky tournament

Source

See also
2017–18 Sacramento State Hornets women's basketball team

References

Sacramento State Hornets men's basketball seasons
Sacramento State
Sacramento State Hornets men's basketball
Sacramento State Hornets men's basketball